Jalie A Tucker (born 1954) is a Professor of Health Education and Behavior at the University of Florida. She is known for her research on impulsive and harmful behaviors, such as alcohol and substance use, the effect of the environment on addiction, and natural resolutions to risky behavior including alcohol misuse. She has received numerous awards for  excellence in clinical psychology and addiction research, including the 2015 Award for Distinguished Scientific Contributions to Clinical Psychology from the Society of Clinical Psychology (American Psychological Association (APA), Division 12). She was honored by APA, Division 50 (Society of Addiction Psychology) with the Presidential Award for Service to the Division in 2010 and 2012.

Biography 
Tucker studied chemistry at Stetson University from 1971 to 1973. Subsequently, she attended Duke University, where she graduated magna cum laude with a B.S. in psychology in 1975. Tucker further pursued her education by attending graduate school, obtaining an M.A. (1975) and Ph.D (1977) in Clinical Psychology from Vanderbilt University. At Vanderbilt, Tucker worked with Mark B. Sobell in conducting research on alcohol and its effects on behavior, relapse, and help seeking/recovery from alcohol misuse. In 1998, she completed a M.P.H. in Health Care Organization and Policy at the University of Alabama at Birmingham.

Tucker holds the position of professor in the Department of Health Education and Behavior at the College of Health and Human Performance at the University of Florida. She is also the director of the Center for Behavioral Economic Health Research at the University of Florida. Tucker's former teaching positions includes the University of Florida, Gainesville (1980-1986), Wayne State University (1986-1989), Auburn University  (1989-1999), and University of Alabama at Birmingham (2000-2014). She was a visiting scholar of the Addictive Behaviors Research Center and Department of Psychology at the University of Washington in 1994. Tucker lectures on topics such as stress reduction being a determinant of alcohol usage, historical and contemporary trends of alcohol usage, and alcohol use as a self handicapping strategy.

Tucker has received numerous grants for projects including the CITY Health II Project, Time Horizons and the Behavioral Economics of Recovery from Drinking Problems, and the Recovery and Health Seeking Processes in Problem Drinkers.

Research 
Tucker and her colleagues have studied the effect of the environment on recovery from alcohol misuse and relapse. In one study, she compared individuals who had abstained from alcohol for an average of six years with those who were still active drinkers; in both groups, none of the individuals had received any treatment for substance use. Through interviews, Tucker concluded that individuals who recovered from alcohol misuse had not experienced as many negative events as their peers who had relapsed. In another study examining the relationship between social circumstances and substance abuse, Tucker and colleagues recruited 344 adolescent and young adult residents of low-income neighborhoods in Birmingham, Alabama. They examined the influence of peer pressure by assessing impact of the social network on participants' substance use. The findings confirmed that people who were encouraged by friends and family to use substances had a higher usage rate than those who were discouraged. This is significant because it confirms the importance of social and environmental factors on a person's decisions, especially for individuals transitioning into adulthood. Tucker's research implies that low-income communities are in need of more prevention programs. She also seeks out further research regarding young adults and their substance use in these areas.

Tucker's work has drawn attention to the positive and negative influences that society can have on a person's substance use. By concluding that society's messages can either help or harm a person, Tucker introduces the need for societal discouragement and better prevention programs to lead people in the right direction. Her work on alcoholic recovery and relapse prevention culminated into a book co-edited with Dennis M. Donovan and G. Alan Marlatt titled Changing Addictive Behavior. In this work, the authors present alternative therapeutic treatments for those with mild or moderate alcoholism, suggesting that the clinical approach does not work for all people. They proposed that individualized treatments are necessary for recovery, as mild to moderate cases of addiction may not warrant the extensive, and usually more costly, treatment that more severe cases do. This suggestion was also made in her co-authored book with Diane Grimley, Public Health Tools for Practicing Psychologists, which proposed techniques to heighten the effectiveness of clinical care. The authors suggest that psychological care must be improved upon to become more individualized to each patient's needs.

Representative Publications 
 George, A. A., & Tucker, J. A. (1996). Help-seeking for alcohol-related problems: social contexts surrounding entry into alcoholism treatment or Alcoholics Anonymous. Journal of Studies on Alcohol, 57(4), 449-457.
 Humphreys, K., & Tucker, J. A. (2002). Toward more responsive and effective intervention systems for alcohol‐related problems. Addiction, 97(2), 126-132.
 Tucker, J. A. (1995). Predictors of help‐seeking and the temporal relationship of help to recovery among treated and untreated recovered problem drinkers. Addiction, 90(6), 805-809.
 Tucker, J. A., Cheong, J., James, T. G., Jung, S., & Chandler, S. D. (2020). Preresolution drinking problem severity profiles associated with stable moderation outcomes of natural recovery attempts. Alcoholism: Clinical and Experimental Research, 44(3), 738-745. 
 Tucker, J. A., Vuchinich, R. E., & Sobell, M. B. (1981). Alcohol consumption as a self-handicapping strategy. Journal of Abnormal Psychology, 90(3), 220-230.

References

External links 
 College of Health and Human Performance Faculty Page

American women psychologists
Duke University Trinity College of Arts and Sciences alumni
Vanderbilt University alumni
University of Florida faculty
Living people
1954 births
American women academics
American clinical psychologists